The 1992 NCAA Division II women's soccer tournament was the fifth annual NCAA-sponsored tournament to determine the team national champion of Division II women's college soccer in the United States.

The championship match was hosted at Adelphi University in Garden City, New York.

Barry defeated hosts Adelphi in the final, 3–2, to claim their second national title.

Qualified teams

Bracket

See also 
1992 NCAA Division I Women's Soccer Tournament
NCAA Division III Women's Soccer Championship
1992 NCAA Division II Men's Soccer Championship
NAIA Women's Soccer Championship

References 

NCAA Division II Women's Soccer Championship
NCAA Division II Women's Soccer Tournament
NCAA Division II Women's Soccer Tournament
NCAA Division II Women's Soccer Tournament